Yvelines is a department in the western part of the Île-de-France region in Northern France. In 2019, it had a population of 1,448,207. Its prefecture is Versailles, home to the Palace of Versailles, the principal residence of the King of France from 1682 until 1789, a UNESCO World Heritage Site since 1979. Yvelines' subprefectures are Saint-Germain-en-Laye, Mantes-la-Jolie and Rambouillet.

History
Yvelines was created from the western part of the former department of Seine-et-Oise on 1 January 1968 in accordance with a law passed on 10 January 1964 and a décret d'application (a decree specifying how a law should be enforced) from 26 February 1965. It inherited Seine-et-Oise's official number of 78 since it took up the largest portion of its territory. In addition to this, it inherited Seine-et-Oise's prefecture, Versailles.

Yvelines derives its name from the Forest of Yveline, next to Rambouillet.

It gained the communes of Châteaufort and Toussus-le-Noble from the adjacent department of Essonne in 1969.

The departmental capital, Versailles, which grew up around Louis XIV's château, was also the French capital for more than a century under the Ancien Régime and again between 1871 and 1879 during the early years of the Third Republic. Since then the château has continued to welcome the French Parliament when it is called upon to sit in a congressional sitting (with both houses sitting together) in order to enact constitutional changes or to listen to a formal declaration by the President.

Geography

Situation
Yvelines is bordered by the departments of Val-d'Oise on the north, Hauts-de-Seine on the east, Essonne on the southeast, Eure-et-Loir on the southwest and Eure on the west.

The eastern part of the department, as well as its northern part along the Seine, is part of the Paris metropolitan area, but the rest of the department is rural, much of it covered by the Forest of Rambouillet (also known as the Forest of Yveline, from which the name of the department is derived).

Two regional parks can be found in Yvelines: Haute Vallée de Chevreuse Regional Natural Park and part of Vexin Français Park. Yvelines is home to one of France's best known golf courses, La Tuilerie-Bignon, in the village of Saint-Nom-la-Bretèche.

Principal towns

Besides Versailles (the prefecture and most populous commune) and the subprefectures of Mantes-la-Jolie, Rambouillet, and Saint-Germain-en-Laye, important cities include Conflans-Sainte-Honorine, Poissy, Les Mureaux, Houilles, Plaisir, Sartrouville, Chatou, Le Chesnay, and the new agglomeration community of Saint-Quentin-en-Yvelines. As of 2019, there are 21 communes with more than 20,000 inhabitants. The 10 most populous communes are:

Demographics
In French, a man from the Yvelines is called Yvelinois (plural Yvelinois); a woman is Yvelinoise (plural ''Yvelinoises).

Population development since 1876

Place of birth of residents

Tourism

Palaces and châteaux
 Palace of Versailles
 Château de Breteuil
 Château du Haut-Buc
 Château de Dampierre
 Château de Maisons
 Château de Rambouillet
 Château de Saint-Germain-en-Laye
 Château of Thoiry
 Château de Vaux-sur-Seine
 Château de Mauvières
 Château du Pont
 Château de Villette
 Château de Millemont

Museums
 Museum of National Antiques (Saint-Germain-en-Laye)
 Museum of River and Canal Craft (Conflans-Sainte-Honorine)
 Horse-drawn Coach Museum (Versailles)
 Toy Museum (Poissy)
 Sheep Museum (Rambouillet)
 Cloth Museum of Jouy (Jouy-en-Josas)
 National Barn Museum of Port-Royal (Magny-les-Hameaux)
 International Museum of Naive Art
 Musee Lambinet (Versailles)

Artists' and writers' houses
 Maurice Denis's house, the Musée départemental Maurice Denis (Saint-Germain-en-Laye)
André Derain's house (Chambourcy)
Alexandre Dumas, père's Château de Monte-Cristo (Port-Marly)
 Maurice Ravel's house/museum (Montfort-l'Amaury)
 Jean-Claude Richard's family estate (Saint-Nom-la-Bretèche)
Elsa Triolet-Aragon's house (Saint-Arnoult-en-Yvelines)
 Ivan Turgenev House (Bougival)
 Émile Zola's house (Médan)

Parks and gardens
 Chèvreloup Arboretum (Rocquencourt)
 Marly Estate (Marly-le-Roi)
 Vaux-sur-Seine Castle Garden (Vaux-sur-Seine)
 The King's Vegetable Garden (Versailles)
 Outdoor and entertainment base of Saint-Quentin-en-Yvelines (Trappes)

Politics
In both local and national elections, the department generally supports centre-right political candidates. Michel Rocard, who served as Prime Minister of France from 1988 to 1991 under President François Mitterrand, was an MP for the department in the Socialist Party. The president of the Departmental Council is Pierre Bédier, first elected in 2014.

Presidential elections 2nd round

Members of the National Assembly
In the 2017 legislative election, Yvelines elected the following representatives to the National Assembly:

Senators
In the Senate, Yvelines is represented by:

 Toine Bourrat (DVD), since 2020
 Marta de Cidrac (LR), since 2017
 Gérard Larcher (LR), since 2007 (President of the Senate since 2014)
 Michel Laugier (UDI), since 2017
 Martin Lévrier (REM), since 2017
 Sophie Primas (LR), since 2011

See also
Cantons of the Yvelines department
Communes of the Yvelines department
Arrondissements of the Yvelines department

References

External links
  Prefecture of Yvelines
  Departmental council of Yvelines
   History of Famous People and Yvelines

 
Departments of Île-de-France
1968 establishments in France
States and territories established in 1968